Nalla Kaalam Porandaachu is a 1990 Indian Tamil-language film, directed by T. P. Gajendran and produced by S. Gowari and S. Ramamoorthy. The film stars Prabhu, Rajesh, Ramya Krishnan and Sujatha, while Senthil, Anandaraj, and Delhi Ganesh play supporting roles. It was released on 14 January 1990.

Plot 

Trying to save his blind mother Shenbagam by a transplant, Muthu discovers that his father Asogan is alive and has been waiting on death row, his execution not for a long time. Arrested for murder and sentenced to hang, on a forced testimony, he awaits his execution. Nevertheless, innocent of alleged acts, he had finally resigned himself of his fate, because nothing more connected him. His son makes, at the moment, makes it a duty to exonerate him by helping him to escape and to find one or several of the real culprits. Law enforcement is thrown on his heels, with an order to shoot him on sight. But nobody can stop the determination of the young man, not even his beloved Uma, a police officer.

Cast 

 Prabhu as Thangamuthu (Muthu)
 Rajesh as Asogan, Muthu's father
 Ramya Krishnan as Police officer Uma (Kannamma, Mahalakshmi)
 Sujatha as Shenbagamu, Muthu's mother
 Senthil as Karuppatti , Muthu's friend
 Anandaraj as Joe
 Delhi Ganesh as Uma's father
 Kuladeivam Rajagopal as Pathaby
 Pandu as Advocate
 K. K. Soundar as Train Passenger
 Loose Mohan as Policeman
 Sethu Vinayagam as Jailor
 Gundu Kalyanam as Asogan's agent
 Typist Gopu as Producer
 Omakuchi Narasimhan as Assistant Producer
 Kuyili as Meena, a dancer
 Priya as Rosy
 Sathyapriya as Maria, Rosy's mother
 Antony
 Cenchi Krishnan
 Shankar–Ganesh as himself

Soundtrack
Soundtrack was composed by Shankar–Ganesh. Lyrics wrote by Vaali and Piraisoodan.
"Chinna Pillai" - S. P. Balasubrahmanyam
"Chinna Vennila" - S. P. Balasubrahmanyam
"Paattu Oru Paattu" - S. P. Balasubrahmanyam
"Chinna Kutty" - Malaysia Vasudevan, S. P. Sailaja
"Kaalai Paartha" - S. P. Balasubrahmanyam, K. S. Chithra

Release and reception
Nalla Kaalam Porandaachu was released on 14 January 1990 alongside another Prabhu starrer Kavalukku Kettikaran. P. S. S. of Kalki found the film to be watchable despite logical mistakes and artificial sets, and praised the film's title for its positivity.

References

External links 
 

1990 films
1990s Tamil-language films
Films directed by T. P. Gajendran
Films scored by Shankar–Ganesh